Sri Muktsar Sahib district,  is one of the 23 districts in the Indian state of Punjab. The capital city of district is Sri Muktsar Sahib. The district itself was historically referred as Khidrane Di Dhaab. There are 4 Tehsils in District which consists of total 234 villages. 1. Sri Muktsar Sahib 2. Lambi  3. Gidderbaha 4. Malout

History

Guru Angad (Nanak II), the Second Guru of the Sikhs was born in the village Matte-di-Sarai (Sarainaga) in 1504 in the same district.

The last battlefield of the tenth Sikh Guru, Shri Guru Gobind Singh ji, lies in the district's main city. The Battle of Muktsar, a major battle between the Mughals and the Sikhs, occurred in present-day Sri Muktsar Sahib during the year of 1705. The Gurudwara Tibbi Sahib was built to mark the battlefield. They were led by Mai Bhago and Mahan Singh.

The Sri Muktsar Sahib district was formed as a new district on 7 November 1995 by the separation of the Muktsar subdivision from the Faridkot district.

The district has many historical Gurudwaras including the Darbar Sahib - Tuti Gandi Sahib Gurudwara, the Shaheed Ganj Gurudwara, Tibbi Sahib Gurudwara, Datansar Sahib Gurudwara, Rakabsar Sahib Gurudwara in the Sri Muktsar Sahib city, and several others in the district's respective villages.

The Mela Maghi fair is celebrated annually in January in the Sri Muktsar Sahib city in remembrance of the forty martyrs (liberated ones).

The Muktsari jutti is famous throughout the world. The shops making and selling these pieces of art are located around the Gurudwara Sahib in the heart of Sri Muktsar Sahib city. Gidderbaha manufactures naswaar which is supplied throughout India.

Demographics

According to the 2011 census Sri Muktsar Sahib district has a total population of 901,896, which consists of Gidderbaha 222,937, Malout 348,165 & Sri Muktsar Sahib 330,794 roughly equal to the nation of Fiji or the US state of Delaware. This gives it a ranking of 464th in India (out of a total of 640). Its population growth rate over the decade 2001-2011 was 16.1%. It has a sex ratio of 895 females for every 1000 males and a literacy rate of 66.8%. Scheduled Castes made up 42.31% of the population.

At the time of the 2011 census, 92.13% of the population spoke Punjabi and 6.79% Hindi as their first language. Bagri is spoken in the south of the district along the Rajasthan and Haryana border.

Politics

See also
Bhangchari
Kauni
Bhuttiwala
Doda, Punjab

References

External links

 
Districts of Punjab, India